Asher ben Matzliach ben Phinhas was the 126th Samaritan High Priest from 1982 to 1984. He was the son of Matzliach ben Phinhas ben Yitzhaq ben Shalma and the nephew of Abisha III ben Phinhas ben Yittzhaq ben Shalma. He succeeded his brother Asher ben Matzliach ben Phinehas as high priest and was succeeded by Yaacob II ben Uzzi ben Yaacob ben Aaharon in 1984. His nephew became high priest Aabed-El ben Asher ben Matzliach.

References 

Samaritan high priests
1899 births

1984 deaths